The Physics of Immortality may refer to:
 The Physics of Immortality (book), 1994 book by Frank J. Tipler
 a 2007 album by The Redding Brothers